Sumita Misra is an Indian civil service servant. She is an Indian Administrative Service officer of 1990 batch. and poetess. Currently, she is posted as Additional Chief Secretary to Agriculture and Farmer Welfare, Haryana and Panchayats Department.

Early life and career
She was born on 30 January 1967 in Lucknow, the capital of Uttar Pradesh. She did BA, and M.A. (Economics) from Lucknow University. She was selected to the IAS in the year 1990 from Haryana Cadre.

Notable works

 A Life of Light - 2012
 Zara Si Dhoop - 2013
 Waqt Ke Ujale Mein - 2016 
 Petrichor - 2017

References

1967 births
Living people
People from Lucknow
Indian Administrative Service officers